DQ (born Peter Andersen on 16 February 1973) is a Danish singer and drag queen who won the Danish Melodi Grand Prix 2007 and therefore represented Denmark in the Eurovision Song Contest 2007 with the song "Drama Queen". The song failed to qualify in the semi-final stage, placing 19th with 45 points.

Notes

External links 
 DQ official site
 Video of song "Drama Queen"

Danish entertainers
Living people
Eurovision Song Contest entrants for Denmark
Eurovision Song Contest entrants of 2007
Dansk Melodi Grand Prix contestants
Dansk Melodi Grand Prix winners
Danish drag queens
1973 births
21st-century Danish singers
21st-century LGBT people